Hussein Ali may refer to:

 Hussein Ali Al-Saedi (born 1996), Iraqi footballer
 Hussein Ali (footballer, born 1982), Egyptian footballer
 Hussein Ali (judoka) (born 1990), Iraqi judoka
 Hussein Ali (footballer, born 2002), Swedish footballer

See also
 Husain Ali (born 1981), Bahraini footballer
 Hussain Ali Baba (born 1982), Bahraini footballer